Life Is Full of Possibilities is the third studio album by American electronic music producer Dntel. It was released on October 30, 2001 by Plug Research.

"(This Is) The Dream of Evan and Chan", a collaboration with Ben Gibbard of Death Cab for Cutie, was released as a single on August 6, 2002. Dntel would collaborate with Gibbard again for an entire album, Give Up, released in 2003 under the name The Postal Service. The song "Life Is Full of Possibilities" includes a repeating sample of Bloop, a sound of undetermined origin.

A two-disc remastered deluxe edition of Life Is Full of Possibilities was released on October 24, 2011 by Sub Pop, which featured four additional songs not included on the initial release, along with remixed versions of other songs from the album.

Track listing

Personnel
Credits are adapted from the album's liner notes.

Musicians
 Dntel – music
 Meredith Figurine – vocals on "Suddenly Is Sooner Than You Think"
 Ben Gibbard – vocals on "(This Is) The Dream of Evan and Chan"
 Chris Gunst – vocals on "Umbrella"
 Rachel Haden – vocals on "Why I'm So Unhappy"
 Paul Larson – guitar on "Last Songs"
 Brian McMahan – guitar on "Why I'm So Unhappy"
 Mia Doi Todd – vocals on "Anywhere Anyone"

Additional personnel
 Low Culture – design
 Brian Tamborello – photography
 D. Zelonky – mastering

References

External links
 

2001 albums
Dntel albums
Plug Research albums